USS Bath has been the name of more than one United States Navy ship, and may refer to:

, originally USS Bath (ID-1997), a cargo ship in commission from 1917 to 1922
, a patrol frigate in commission from 1944 to 1945

United States Navy ship names